Hirson is a commune in the Aisne department in Hauts-de-France in northern France.

Geography

Location 

Hirson is adjacent to Belgium. It is located in the northeastern department of Aisne, near the departments of Nord and Ardennes.
Hirson is part of Thiérache. It is located near two large forests, the forest of Hirson and the forest of Saint-Michel.

Hydrography 
Hirson is watered by the Oise and Gland.
The various streams of the town: stream of Anor, stream of Brugnon, stream of La Marquette, stream of Les Marais, stream of Blangy, stream of Le Catelet, stream of Le Rie De Bon Feu, stream of Four Matot.

Geology and Relief 
The culmination of Hirson is located 268 meters above sea level. The lowest altitude is 157 meters above sea level.

Neighboring municipalities 
Hirson is bordered by eight municipalities: Éparcy, Buire, Neuve-Maison, Mondrepuis, Anor (Nord), Momignies (Belgium), Saint-Michel, Bucilly.

History 
As of 1911, there was a permanent fort and two artillery batteries near the railway junction. Also at that time, the town was engaged in the manufacture of glass bottles, tiles and iron and tin goods, as well as wool-spinning and brewing.

The town is served by the Fives-Hirson railway.

Population
The inhabitants of the town are called Hirsonnais.

Monuments
Churches
 Notre-Dame-de-Lourdes, built in 1908.
 Sainte-Thérèse-de-l'Enfant-Jésus, built around 1930; owned by the pianist Kit Armstrong since 2012.

See also
 Communes of the Aisne department
 Alfred Desmasures

References

Thiérache
Communes of Aisne
Aisne communes articles needing translation from French Wikipedia